Khalsa High School Srinagar was established at its present location in 1942 and 1943.

References

Schools in Srinagar
Private schools in Jammu and Kashmir